Women in the Russian and Soviet militaries have played many roles in their country's military history. Women played an important role in world wars in Russia and the Soviet Union, particularly during World War II.

World War I
Women served in the Russian armed forces in small numbers in the early stages of the war, but their numbers increased after heavy Russian losses such as at the Battle of Tannenberg and Masurian Lakes and a need for increased manpower. One such recruit was Maria Bochkareva who served with the 25th Reserve Battalion of the Russian Army. After the abdication of Nicholas II of Russia in March 1917, she convinced interim prime minister Alexander Kerensky to let her form a women's battalion. The Women's Battalion recruited women between the ages of 13 and 25 and appealed for support in a series of public meetings, enlisting approximately 2,000 soldiers. The Battalion fought during the June Offensive against German forces in 1917. Three months of fighting reduced their numbers to around two-hundred and fifty.

The Women's Battalion was disbanded after a failed military coup known as the Kornilov Affair. Its leader, General Lavr Kornilov, had been strongly supported by Bachkarova, and the Women's Battalion were identified as potential sympathizers. The majority of the battalion's members were reformed as the First Petrograd Women's Battalion. This group was at the Winter Palace on the night of the Bolshevik Revolution, along with an untrained cadet detachment and a bicycle regiment. They put up a fight but were eventually defeated, despite the fact that only 5 people were killed during the storming of the Winter Palace. The triumphant Bolsheviks officially disbanded the group.

Several women pilots are known from the First World War, one example being Sofya Alekseevna Dolgorukova. Princess Eugenie Shakovskaya was assigned duty as an artillery and reconnaissance pilot, having volunteered for the Imperial Russian Air Service in 1914 (one of the world’s first female military aviators) and flew missions with the 26th Corps Air Squadron in 1917 for nine months. Because of her connections to the Imperial family she was demobilized after the October Revolution.  Lyubov A. Golanchikova was a test pilot who contributed her airplane to the Czarist armies; Helen P. Samsonova was assigned to the 5th Corps Air Squadron as a reconnaissance pilot. And in 1915, Nedeshda Degtereva had the distinction of being the first woman pilot to be wounded in combat while on a reconnaissance mission over the Austrian front in Galicia.

World War II

Women played a part in most of the armed forces of the Second World War. In most countries though, women tended to serve mostly in administrative, medical and in auxiliary roles. But in the Soviet Union women fought also in front line roles. Over 800,000 women served in the Soviet armed forces in World War II, mostly as medics and nurses, which is over 3 percent of total personnel; nearly 200,000 of them were decorated. 89 of them eventually received the Soviet Union’s highest award, the Hero of the Soviet Union, they served as pilots, snipers, machine gunners, tank crew members and partisans, as well as in auxiliary roles. Few of these women, however, were promoted to officers.

Aviators
For Soviet women aviators, instrumental to this change was Marina Raskova, a famous Russian aviator. Raskova became a famous aviator as both a pilot and a navigator in the 1930s. She was the first woman to become a navigator in the Soviet Air Force in 1933. Raskova is credited with using her personal connections with Joseph Stalin to convince the military to form three combat regiments for women. The Soviet Union was the first nation to allow women pilots to fly combat missions. These regiments with strength of almost hundred airwomen, flew a combined total of more than 30,000 combat sorties, produced over twenty Heroes of the Soviet Union, and included two fighter aces. This military unit was initially called Aviation Group 122 while the three regiments received training. After their training, the three regiments received their formal designations as the 586th Fighter Aviation Regiment, the 587th Bomber Aviation Regiment, and the 588th Night Bomber Regiment. Two of the units were honored with the Guards designation and renamed.

Land forces
The Soviet Union also used women for sniping duties, and to good effect, including Nina Alexeyevna Lobkovskaya and Lyudmila Pavlichenko (who killed over 300 enemy soldiers). The Soviets found that sniper duties fit women well, since good snipers are patient, careful, deliberate, and should avoid tactical hand-to-hand combat. Women served also in non-combat roles as medics, nurses, communication personnel, political officers, as well - in small numbers - as machine gunners, tank drivers. Manshuk Mametova was a machine gunner from Kazakhstan and was the first Asian woman to receive the title Hero of the Soviet Union after she refused to retreat with the rest of her regiment.

Partisans
Women constituted significant numbers of the Soviet partisans. One of the most famous was Zoya Kosmodemyanskaya, who was posthumously awarded the title Hero of the Soviet Union on 16 February 1942.

The youngest woman to become a Hero of the Soviet Union was also a resistance fighter, Zinaida Portnova.

Cold War 
After the war, most women left the armed forces. Those that stayed to make a career in the post-war armed forces saw old attitudes return and promotion and opportunities more difficult. Also, some military academies closed their doors to women despite the supposed official policy of equality. In 1967, the Soviet Universal Military Duty Laws concluded that women offered the greater source of available soldiers during periods of large scale mobilization. Thus, several programs during the height of the Cold War were set up to encourage women to enlist. Participation in military orientated youth programs and forced participation in the reserves for ex-servicewomen up to the age of 40 are some examples. Universities contained reservist officer training which accompanied a place in the reserves themselves, especially for doctors. But some roles open to women during the war were later barred.

Russian Federation

Yeltsin era 
At the end of 1992, when conscription of noncommissioned officers and enlisted personnel was converted to volunteer or contract recruitment, women were given equal rights with men to join the Russian Armed Forces. Between 1990 and 1999, the percentage of women in the armed forces grew from 3.5% to almost 10%. Similar phenomena happened in other countries around the world in the late 20th century.

Smirnov (2002) cited a September–November 1999 survey that he and colleagues conducted amongst a representative sample of 993 servicewomen, indicating that female soldiers generally had a much higher educational level than their male counterparts, their average age was about 30 and they had achieved considerable experience. However, the socioeconomic conditions for women in Russia were worsening ('women who are pushed out of paid work into unpaid housework, irregular occupation, and unemployment constitute an urgent social problem in Russia'), and thus 'seriously complicate[d] their integration into the military community'. According to the 1999 survey, 67.9% of military women were married, and they accounted for 57.1% of all servicewomen who had children (71.4%); all other female soldiers were much less likely to have children. There was also a clear link between education and parenthood: the more educated people were, the fewer children they had. Smirnov noted that divorce rates had gone up and marriage rates had gone down in the 1990s; he stated that divorced and widowed women were 'the least socially protected group', as they were often poorer and several of them even lacked housing.
53.9% of the women in the survey believed that husbands should work to support the family and wives should take care of the house; these women only entered military service due to 'material hardship', as they didn't have a husband or partner (yet/anymore), or their husbands or partners were (presumably temporarily) unable to earn enough money for the whole family. 29.2% of Russian servicewomen said 'that married women ought to work on an equal footing with their husbands.' Working enabled them to realise their own potential more fully, to acquire a certain amount of independence, earn respect from colleagues and achieve creative success that would not be possible at home, without ignoring (potential) family interests, the survey found.
8.7% of women soldiers stated that their labour rights had been violated in some way, such as being 'passed over for promotion' (33.2%), 'appointed to positions affording less monetary support' (31.6%), and 'deprived of prospects for solving the housing problem' (41%), while 57.1% weren't sure whether they had been discriminated against or not. Single mothers, married women, divorcees, and widows were far less likely to be promoted to higher positions 'because their superior officers [were] firmly convinced that family concerns would prevent them from carrying out their official duties.' Smirnov's team observed that 'women watch[ed] resentfully as men with less education [were] preferred for promotion.' Only 3,300 women (2.9%) were commissioned officers, mostly in junior positions, and usually tasked to carry out administrative duties 'that men ignore[d] for some reason', forcing servicewomen 'to be content with assignments that are not the most prestigious.'

Putin era 
In 2002, 10% of the Russian armed forces (100,000 of a total active strength of 988,100) were women according to the International Institute for Strategic Studies, whereas researcher Aleksandr I. Smirnov stated that about 114,600 women had military contracts that year. A 2016 TASS article stated: 'At the end of the 2000s, over 90,000 women were serving in the Russian Armed Forces', but that number fell to 'about 45,000' in 2011. TASS explained this drop as follows: 'After the military authorities increased their requirements for female applicants and in connection with the overall reduction in the number of service personnel in the RF Armed Forces, this number has decreased significantly.' By 2010, the motivations that servicewomen gave for working in the armed forces had also shifted markedly: 67% of women served out of financial necessity (up from 53.9% in 1999), while only 6% were focused on military service as their professional career (down from 29.2% in 1999).

Between 2010 and 2020, the total number of women employed in the Russian military fluctuated between 35,000 and 45,000. Defence Minister Sergei Shoigu stated in May 2020 that  41,000 women ( 4.26% of total active duty forces) were enlisted in the Russian Armed Forces. This percentage was relatively low compared to most Western countries (the United States military had 16.5% at the time), and also to China ( 9% at the time). As of September 2020, conscription was only mandatory for males aged 18–27; members of the State Duma have at times suggested to include females, but such proposals were not adopted. Moreover, unlike foreign men, foreign women were not allowed to join the Russian military. Eligible female Russian citizens faced a large number of restrictions and prohibitions on the types of positions they could apply for and hold: "Russian women are not permitted in frontline combat roles and are therefore typically restricted from service on aircraft, submarines, or tanks. Though the full list is classified, women are also restricted from being mechanics and from performing sentry duties." A notable case is that of a woman named Yana Surgaeva, who was turned away by military recruiters who sent her a letter saying "the approval of military service by women as a driver, mechanic, sniper or gunner is not permitted." Surgaeva then sued the Ministry of Defence and National Guard, and went on to appeal both to the Supreme Court and the Constitutional Court, but both courts refused to hear the case.

Chesnut (2020) compared a 2019 survey showing that public opinion in the Russian Federation was simultaneously moving towards more gender equality, but "retreating" towards traditional gender roles, with a 2020 poll conducted by the state-run Russian Public Opinion Research Center (VTsIOM) showing that social attitudes amongst Russians had become less favourable towards women serving in the military. In the 2020 poll, 62% of respondents indicated that they would like to see a son of theirs to serve in the military (with 25% saying "because it is a man's job"), while 63% said they didn't want a daughter to join the army (with 42% saying "the army is not a woman's business, the army is for men").

The Russian military has faced severe personnel shortages after the 2008 Russian military reform, being only "manned" to  70% in 2012. In response, the Ministry of Defence mounted an aggressive campaign against draft evasion amongst men to increase coverage levels to 90~95% by 2020, but 'made little apparent effort to enlist women' in doing so. Despite a 2014 announcement by Deputy Defence Minister Tatiana Shevtsova to enlarge the number of servicewomen in the Russian Armed Forces to 80,000 by 2020, this goal was not achieved (it was  41,000 in May 2020). Some observers have concluded that the government had overlooked an obvious source of "manpower" by ignoring the large pool of potential female soldiers.

Russo-Ukrainian War

2022 invasion of Ukraine 
On 12 July 2022, Russian media reported the first death of Russian female soldier in the country's ongoing invasion of Ukraine. The soldier was Anastasia Savitskaya, a corporal from Volgograd.

See also 
 Russian Armed Forces
 Soviet Armed Forces
 Soviet women in World War II
 Women in the Russian Revolution
 Women in Russia

References

Further reading

World War II era 

 Campbell, D'Ann. "Women in Combat: The World War Two Experience in the United States, Great Britain, Germany, and the Soviet Union" Journal of Military History (April 1993), 57:301-323. online edition
 Cottam, K. Jean. "Soviet Women in Combat in World War II: The Ground Forces and the Navy," International Journal of Women's Studies (1980) 3#4 pp 345–357
 Cottam, K. Jean. "Soviet Women in Combat in World War II: The Rear Services, Resistance behind Enemy Lines and Military Political Workers," International Journal of Women's Studies (1982) 5#4 pp 363–378
 Cottam, K. Jean. Soviet Airwomen in Combat in World War II (Manhattan, KS: Military Affairs/Aerospace Historian Publishing, 1983)
 Krylova, Anna. Soviet Women in Combat: A History of Violence on the Eastern Front (2010)
 Krylova, Anna. "Stalinist Identity from the Viewpoint of Gender: Rearing a Generation of Professionally Violent Women-Fighters in 1930s Stalinist Russia," Gender & History  (2004) 16#3 pp 626–653.
 Markwick, Roger D.  "A Sacred Duty": Red Army Women Veterans Remembering the Great Fatherland War, 1941-1945," Australian Journal of Politics & History, (2008), 54#3 pp. 403-420.
 Maubach, Franka; Satjukow, Silke. "Zwischen Emanzipation und Trauma: Soldatinnen im Zweiten Weltkrieg (Deutschland, Sowjetunion, USA)" Historische Zeitschrift, (April 2009), Vol. 288 Issue 2, pp 347–384
 Merry, Lois K. Women Military Pilots of World War II: A History with Biographies of American, British, Russian and German Aviators., (2010).
 Pennington, Reina. Wings, Women & War: Soviet Airwomen in World War II Combat, (2007).  Foreword by John Erickson.
 Pennington, Reina. "Offensive Women: Women in Combat in the Red Army in the Second World War" Journal of Military History, (2010) 74#3 pp 775–820
 Sakaida, Henry & Hook, Christina, Heroines of the Soviet Union 1941–45 (2003).

Russian Federation era 
 
 Mathers, Jennifer G. Women in the Russian Armed Forces: A Marriage of Convenience? - Statistical Data Included, Minerva: Quarterly Report on Women and the Military, Fall-Winter, 2000
 
 Women in/and the Military, Journal of Power Institutions in Post-Soviet Societies, Issue 4/5, 2006

External links

 

Women soldiers
Women's rights in the Soviet Union